Events in the year 1946 in Mandatory Palestine.

Incumbents
 High Commissioner – Sir Alan Cunningham
 Emirate of Transjordan – Abdullah I bin al-Hussein until 25 May (thereafter King of Transjordan)
 Prime Minister of Emirate of Transjordan – Ibrahim Hashem until 25 May (thereafter Kingdom of Transjordan)

Events

 January – The founding of the kibbutz Ami'ad.
 25 February – Irgun and Lehi members blow up dozens of British military aircraft in airports at Lydda, Qastina and Sirkin.
 22 March – The ruler of Transjordan, Emir Abdullah I, negotiated a new Anglo-Transjordanian treat, under which the Emirate of Transjordan (part of the British Mandate of Palestine) gained full independence and become the Hashemite Kingdom of Transjordan.
 25 April – Members of Lehi kill seven British soldiers guarding a military car park in Tel Aviv.
 30 April – The Anglo-American Committee of Inquiry recommended the immediate admission of 100,000 Jewish refugees from Europe into Palestine. It also recommended that Palestine remain a mandated territory, that facilities be put in place to ensure Jewish migration and that the 1940 Land Act which banned Jews from purchasing land in 95% of Palestine be rescinded.
 25 May – The United Kingdom grants full sovereignty to Transjordan. The parliament of Transjordan proclaimed the ruler of Transjordan, emir Abdullah, as Transjordan's king and formally changed the name of the country from the Emirate of Transjordan to the Hashemite Kingdom of Transjordan. Three years later the country changes its name to Jordan.
 16 June – Night of the Bridges: Ten Palmach members blow up bridges across Palestine which link Palestine to the neighboring countries Lebanon, Syria, Transjordan and Egypt, in order to immobilize its transportation.
 29 June – Operation Agatha
 22 July – King David Hotel bombing: Irgun members detonate bombs in the basement of the King David Hotel in Jerusalem, where the British had brought a large amount of documents confiscated from the Jewish Agency for Israel. The attack kills 91 people and injures 45 more, mostly civilians. The hotel was a center of British administration at the time, although Arabs and Jews were also victims. The Jewish National Council condemns the attack.
 6 October – The founding of the kibbutz Urim.
 6 October – The founding of the kibbutz Be'eri.
 6 October – The founding of the kibbutz Gal On.
 6 October – The founding of the kibbutz Hatzerim.
 6 October – The founding of the kibbutz Mishmar HaNegev.
 6 October – The founding of the kibbutz Nirim.
 6 October – The founding of the kibbutz Shoval.
 23 October – The founding of the kibbutz Ein Tzurim.
 30 October – The founding of the kibbutz Dovrat.
 26 November – The founding of the kibbutz Yehiam.
 December – David Ben-Gurion appointed director of Jewish Agency for Israel security policy at the Zionist Congress in Basle.

Unknown dates
 The founding of the kibbutz Regba.

Notable births
 1 January – Nissan Slomiansky, Israeli politician
 7 January – Aviem Sella, Israeli fighter pilot
 5 February – Amnon Dankner, Israeli newspaper editor and author (died 2013)
 22 February – Motti Mizrachi, Israeli artist
 26 February – Ephraim Sidon, Israeli author, playwright and satirist
 12 March – Ya'acov Dorchin, Israeli sculptor and painter
 15 April – Tsvi Misinai, Israeli computer scientist and researcher
 18 April – Nahum Manbar, Israeli businessman convicted for selling arms to Iran
 24 April – Benjamin Rawitz-Castel, Israeli classical pianist (died 2006)
 26 April – Michael Reisser, Israeli politician (died 1988).
 11 May – Moni Fanan, Israeli basketball team manager (died 2009).
 2 June – Gideon Remez, Israeli journalist.
 21 June – Ehud Adiv, Israeli anti-Zionist activist imprisoned for collaborating with Syria and the PLO
 7 July – Amiram Levin, Israeli general and Mossad deputy director
 1 September – Shalom Hanoch, Israeli singer
 15 September – Yitzchak Dovid Grossman, Israeli rabbi, founder and dean of the Migdal Ohr educational NGO and member of the Chief Rabbinate Council
 20 September – Dudu Topaz, Israeli TV personality, comedian, actor, screenwriter, playwright, author and radio and television host (died 2009)
 4 October – Dov Weissglass, Israeli lawyer, businessman, and manager and office bureau chief for the Prime Minister
 6 October – Menachem Zilberman, Israeli actor, comedian, and songwriter (died 2014)
 8 October – Hanan Ashrawi, Palestinian Arab scholar, legislator and political activist
 16 October – Ya'akov Yosef, Israeli rabbi and politician (died 2013)
 16 October – Israel Bartal, Israeli historian
 18 October – Eliezer Moses, Israeli politician
 20 October – Tsvia Walden, Israeli psycholinguist
 17 November – Nehemiah Tamari, Israeli major general (Aluf) and head of IDF Central Command (died 1994)
 18 November – Naomi Chazan, Israeli politician, academic, and political activist.
 28 November – Nachman Shai, Israeli politician, military spokesman, and journalist.
 20 December – Uri Geller, Israeli paranormalist
 24 December – Uri Barbash, Israeli film director
Full date unknown
 Esther Farbstein, Israeli historian
 Kohava Levy, Israeli singer-songwriter
 Adiva Geffen, Israeli author and playwright

Notable deaths
 22 July – Edward Sperling, Russian-born Zionist writer, humorist, and Mandate government official, killed in the King David Hotel bombing.

References

 
Palestine
Years in Mandatory Palestine